Unnatural Selection is an original novel based on the U.S. television series Buffy the Vampire Slayer. Tagline: "An environmental evil haunts Willow".

Plot summary

Willow is baby-sitting one night when suddenly the baby she's taking care of changes into an evil faerie and tells her that she needs to work harder to save Weatherly Park from being converted into an amusement park. The faerie then attacks Willow before vanishing. After some research, Giles discovers that the fairy is a Russian variety called the domovoi, apparently hiding out beneath Weatherly Park. The faeries also have plans for Willow; they need the blood of a witch in order to resurrect the Homestone which will renew the faeries' strength.

Characters include: Buffy, Joyce, Giles, Xander, Angel, Cordelia, Willow, and Oz. First original Buffy novel not to feature Sarah Michelle Gellar on the cover.

Continuity
Supposed to be set late in Buffy season 3.
In "Child of the Hunt" and "Out of the Madhouse" Willow encountered "faerie folk". In this book she is unaware of them.

Canonical issues

Buffy novels such as this one are not usually considered by fans as canonical. Some fans consider them stories from the imaginations of authors and artists, while other fans consider them as taking place in an alternative fictional reality. However unlike fan fiction, overviews summarising their story, written early in the writing process, were 'approved' by both Fox and Joss Whedon (or his office), and the books were therefore later published as officially Buffy merchandise.

External links
Interview with  Mel Odom at Watcher's Web. Includes some questions and answers about Unnatural Selection.

Reviews
Litefoot1969.bravepages.com - Review of this book by Litefoot
Nika-summers.com - Review of this book by Nika Summers
Shadowcat.name - Review of this book

1999 novels
Books based on Buffy the Vampire Slayer
Novels by Mel Odom